Mikael Portukal Pasha, also known as Mikael Portakalyan (1841 – 1897) was an Ottoman-Armenian economist, educator and politician during the late Tanzimat period.

References 

1841 births
1897 deaths
Armenian educators 
Armenian economists
Armenians from the Ottoman Empire
Political people from the Ottoman Empire